Kei car (or , kanji: , "light automobile"), is the Japanese vehicle category for the smallest highway-legal passenger cars, with restricted dimensions and engine capacity. Similar Japanese categories exist for microvans, and kei trucks. These vehicles are most often the Japanese equivalent of the EU A-segment (city cars).

The kei car category was created by the Japanese government in 1949, and the regulations have been revised several times since. These regulations specify a maximum vehicle size, engine capacity, and power output, so that owners may enjoy both tax and insurance benefits. In most rural areas they are also exempted from the requirement to certify that adequate parking is available for the vehicle.

Kei cars have become very successful in Japan, consisting of over one-third of domestic new-car sales in fiscal 2016, despite dropping from a record 40% market share in 2013, after the government increased the kei-car tax by 50% in 2014. In 2018, seven of the 10 top-selling models were kei cars, including the top four, all boxy passenger vans: Honda N-Box, Suzuki Spacia, Nissan Dayz, and Daihatsu Tanto. Isuzu is the only current Japanese automobile manufacturer that has never offered a kei-sized vehicle for either private ownership or commercial trucks and microvans.

In export markets, the genre is generally too specialized and too small for most models to be profitable. Notable exceptions exist, for instance the Suzuki Alto and Daihatsu Cuore, which were exported consistently from around 1980. Kei cars are not only popular with the elderly, but they are also popular with youths, especially younger families because of their affordability and ease of use.

Nearly all kei cars have been designed and manufactured in Japan, but a version of the German-made Smart was briefly imported and officially classified as a kei car, and since then, the British Caterham 7 160 has also received such classification.

Description
Kei cars feature yellow license plates, earning them the name "yellow-plate cars" (black numbers on yellow background for private use and yellow numbers on black background for commercial use) in English-speaking circles. Japanese government regulations limit the physical size, engine power, and engine displacement of kei cars. Keis have also been subject to other restrictions, such as lower speed limits, including a warning chime that goes off if being driven too fast.

Kei cars are often available with forced-induction engines, automatic and continuously variable transmissions, front-wheel drive and all-wheel drive.

History

360-cc era (1949–1975)

The kei-car legal class originated in the era following the end of World War Two, when most Japanese could not afford a full-sized car, but many had enough money to buy a motorcycle. To promote the growth of the car industry, as well as to offer an alternative delivery method to small business and shop owners, the kei- car category and standards were created. Originally limited to a displacement of only  (or just 100 cc for two-stroke engines) in 1949, dimensions and engine size limitations were gradually expanded (in 1950, 1951, and 1955) to tempt more manufacturers to produce kei cars.

These included the 1955 Suzuki Suzulight and the 1958 Subaru 360, the first mass-produced kei car, finally able to fill people's need for basic transportation without being too severely compromised. In 1955, the Japanese Ministry of International Trade and Industry also set forth goals to develop a "national car" that was larger than kei cars produced at the time. This goal influenced Japanese automobile manufacturers to determine how best to focus their product development efforts for the smaller cars, or the larger "national car". The small exterior dimensions and engine displacement reflected the driving environment in Japan, with speed limits in Japan realistically not exceeding  in urban areas.

The class then went through a period of ever increasing sophistication, with an automatic transmission appearing in the Honda N360 in August 1968, with front disc brakes becoming available on a number of sporting kei cars, beginning with the Honda Z GS of January 1970. Power outputs also kept climbing, reaching a peak in the  Daihatsu Fellow Max SS of July 1970. Sales increased steadily, reaching a peak of 750,000 in 1970. Throughout the 1970s, the government kept whittling away at the benefits offered to kei vehicles, which combined with ever stricter emissions standards to lower sales drastically through the first half of the decade. Honda and Mazda withdrew from the contracting passenger kei-car market, in 1974 and 1976, respectively, although they both maintained a limited offering of commercial vehicles.

Until 31 December 1974, kei cars used smaller license plates than regular cars . To set them apart from regular passenger cars, the plates were now yellow and black rather than white and green.

550-cc era (1976–1990)

Sales had been steadily declining, reaching a low-water mark of 150,000 passenger cars in 1975, 80% less than 1970 sales. Many were beginning to doubt the continued existence of the kei car, with both Honda and Mazda withdrawing in the middle of the 1970s.

Emissions laws were another problem for the kei-car industry in the mid-1970s. From 1973 to 1978, emissions standards were to be tightened in four steps. Meeting the stricter standards, which were to be introduced in 1975, would be problematic for manufacturers of kei cars. This was particularly hard for Daihatsu and Suzuki, which focused on two-stroke engines, especially Suzuki, a relatively small company whose entire production consisted of two-stroke kei cars. Daihatsu, though, had both the engineering backing and powerful connections of their large owner, Toyota, to aid them in meeting the new requirements. All manufacturers of kei cars were clamoring for increased engine displacement and vehicle size limits, claiming that the emissions standards could not be met with a functional 360-cc engine. The new standards were announced on 26 August 1975, leaving very little time for manufacturers to revise their designs to take advantage of the new limits.

Most manufacturers were somewhat surprised by the decision; having expected a  limit, they had already developed new engines to fit such restrictions. These new engines were quickly introduced, usually mounted within widened bodies of existing models. These interim versions (with displacements ranging between 443 and 490 cc) were "feelers", developed to see if indeed a continued market existed for the kei car. As sales improved, they only lasted for a model year or so until manufacturers had the time to develop "full-sized" engines. Only Daihatsu managed to avoid developing transitional engine versions that did not take full advantage of the new regulations. Kei-car sales remained stagnant, however, while combined passenger and commercial kei car sales reached 700,000 for the first time since 1974, the small cars still lost market share in a quickly growing market.

As the kei cars became larger and more powerful, another benefit appeared, as exports increased considerably. In particular, export sales of trucks increased, while kei passenger car exports increased at a lower rate. In 1976, combined exports of kei cars and trucks were 74,633 (up 171% year-on-year), despite exports of passenger kei cars decreasing. In 1980, another record year occurred as exports climbed 80.3% (to 94,301 units), of which 77.6% were microtrucks. Nearly 17% of exports went to Europe, dwarfed by Chile, which took nearly a quarter of the exported keis. Due to the difficult economic environment, low-priced cars sold well and 1981 marked another successful year as Japanese midget car sales reached their highest since the 1970 record (at 1,229,809 units for cars and commercials).

As the 1980s progressed, kei cars became increasingly refined, losing their utilitarian origins, as Japanese customers became ever better off. Features such as four-wheel drive, turbochargers, and air conditioning began to become available on kei-car models. Conversely, van versions of the small hatchbacks were now marketed to nonbusiness users, to take advantage of even lower taxation and laxer emissions rules; this move in the market was spearheaded by Suzuki with their 1979 Alto, and competitors soon followed suit, with the Subaru Family Rex and the Daihatsu Mira appearing within a year's time.

Government rules also mandated a warning chime to alert the driver if this speed were exceeded.

660-cc era (1990–2014)

These changes occurred during the 1990s Japanese economic bubble, and all manufacturers quickly developed new models to suit. Within five months, all the major models of kei cars had switched from 550- to 660-cc  engines. For the first time, a power limit was also applied, in addition to the limit on engine size. This power limit of  matched the highest output reached by any kei manufacturer at the time and was a gentlemen's agreement amongst the manufacturers in an effort to avoid a kei-class horsepower war. The only kei-engined car to have exceeded this limit was the Caterham 7 160, a lightweight British sports car that was not expected to qualify as a kei, though it is small enough (in dimensions and displacement) to fit the regulations.

The addition of a power limit was a response to the ever-increasing power outputs available with turbocharging and multivalve technologies popularized in the late '80s. Engine technology was also shared with sport bikes, which are designed for rider enjoyment, and less so for fuel economy – going against the idea of small, people's cars and putting the kei cars' tax and structural advantages at risk of a governmental backlash.

In a rare example of an overseas mass-produced model being sold as a kei car in Japan, a kei version of the Smart Fortwo (called the Smart K) was sold at the Yanase dealerships in Japan from 2001 to 2004. The Smart K used revised rear fenders and reduced tire dimensions and track width to conform to kei-car regulations. The model was not a success, and it sold the fewest examples of a kei car when it was marketed.

The Suzuki Wagon R was the best-selling kei car in Japan from 2003 to 2008.

Starting in 2011, Toyota entered the kei-car market for the first time. The resulting Toyota Pixis Space, a rebadged Daihatsu Move Conte, was expected to increase competition in that market. Currently, Nissan and Mitsubishi jointly produce the Mitsubishi eK (also sold as the Nissan Dayz or Nissan Otti). Honda's kei-car line-up, the N-one, N-Box, and N-WGN, accounts for around a quarter of its overall sales.

Reduced incentives (2014–present) 

In April 2014, the Japanese government significantly reduced advantages for kei-car owners, imposing higher sales tax, higher gasoline tax and a higher kei car tax – the last of which was raised by 50 percent – greatly reducing their tax benefits compared to regular-sized cars.

Daihatsu, Honda, Suzuki and Nissan-Mitsubishi (through NMKV joint venture) are currently the only mass-production manufacturers of kei cars. Mazda sells rebadged Suzuki models, Toyota and Subaru sell badge-engineered Daihatsu models, while Nissan-Mitsubishi sourced their commercial kei models from Suzuki.

Electric kei cars

The electric version of the Mitsubishi i, the Mitsubishi i-MiEV was the first electric kei car. This was launched for fleet purchasers in 2009 in the Japanese domestic market. It became available to the wider public in 2010, also international sales started that year. The i-MiEV uses a  permanent-magnet motor powered by a 16 kWh lithium-ion battery pack. The models charge overnight in 14 hours from home 100-volt mains, or in 30 minutes from quick-charging stations installed at fleet locations. The range is  using the U.S. EPA testing routine and  using the Japanese Transport Ministry's testing routine. It was the world's first mass-produced electric car, and also the first electric car to sell more than 10,000 units.

Rebadged and slightly updated variants of the i-MiEV were also sold in Europe by PSA Peugeot Citroën as the Peugeot iOn and Citroën C-Zero. In 2011, Mitsubishi launched MINICAB-MiEV; a battery electric version of the microvan Minicab, borrowing the drivetrain and key components from the i-MiEV. As of March 2015, and accounting for all variants of the i-MiEV, including the two minicab versions sold in Japan, over 50,000 units have been sold worldwide since 2009. The i-MiEV and rebadged versions are discontinued in all the markets now.

In May 2022, NMKV launched the Nissan-badged Sakura and the Mitsubishi-badged eK X EV in the Japanese domestic market. The eK X EV is a battery-electric version of the Mitsubishi eK X, and the Sakura is an update to Nissan's Dayz line. As of June 2022, these are currently the cheapest battery EV from a major Japanese manufacturer sold as a new car; also eligible for EV purchase incentives in Japan.

Taxation and insurance 
The vehicle excise tax levy is 2% of the purchase price, compared to 3% for a regular car.

An automobile weight tax also is levied: The amount is ¥13,200 and ¥8,800 for a three- and two-year period, respectively, as compared to the ¥18,900 and ¥12,600 charged for larger-sized passenger cars. The savings are thus more than 30% in both cases. This weight tax is paid after the vehicle has passed its safety inspection.
 
The required road tax is based on the engine's displacement.
 
A 24-month insurance contract typically costs ¥18,980 at the time of registration, versus ¥22,470 for a larger car.

Best-selling models

Gallery

360-cc era

550-cc era

Sport

Present

See also
Kei truck

References

Further reading

 
Road transport in Japan
Car classifications
1949 introductions